State Route 267 (SR 267), known as North Shore Boulevard, is a state highway in the U.S. state of California. It connects Interstate 80 in Truckee with State Route 28 in Kings Beach on Lake Tahoe's shoreline. It serves as an alternate route to State Route 89 for connecting between Interstate 80 and State Route 28 near the Nevada border. SR 267 also serves the Northstar California ski resort.

Route description

The route begins at Interstate 80 in Truckee with an interchange. It then continues through Nevada County until it reaches the county line. In Placer County, it meets its east end at SR 28 in Kings Beach.

SR 267 is not part of the National Highway System, a network of highways that are considered essential to the country's economy, defense, and mobility by the Federal Highway Administration. The route from I-80 to Brockway Road is named the CHP Officer Glenn Carlson Memorial Bypass after CHP officer Glenn W. Carlson, who was killed along the route in 1963.

Major intersections

See also

References

External links

California @ AARoads.com - State Route 267
Caltrans: Route 267 highway conditions
California Highways: SR 267

267
State Route 267
State Route 267
Truckee, California